The National Society of Pershing Rifles is a military-oriented honor society for college-level students founded in 1894 as a drill unit at the University of Nebraska–Lincoln. It is the oldest continuously operating US college organization dedicated to military drill. Originally named Varsity Rifles, members renamed the organization in honor of their mentor and patron, Lieutenant (later General of the Armies of the United States) John J. Pershing, upon his departure from the university in 1895.

Pershing Rifles became a National organization in 1928 expanding to include several other universities, with companies consisting of drill teams as well as tactical units. Together, these units form what is known as the National Society of Pershing Rifles.

Mission

The mission of the National Society of Pershing Rifles is to aid in the development of successful officers in the Army, Navy, and Air Force. To foster camaraderie and esprit de corps among all three Reserve Officers' Training Corps programs. To further the purpose, traditions, and concepts of the United States Army, Navy, and Air Force. And to give civilians an opportunity to be part of a military organization without a formal commitment to the military.

Symbols
The symbols of Pershing Rifles are:

 Official Colors – Blue and white are the official colors of Pershing Rifles. These colors have traditional national significance and each represent the cornerstones of the Society and its members. Blue is symbolic of Loyalty, Devotion, Friendship and Truth. White symbolizes Purity, Cleanliness of Life and Rectitude of Conduct. All are qualities in which Pershing Rifles looks for in its members.
 Coat of Arms – The shield, crossed rifles and torch design with "P" and "R" had been used by Pershing Rifles as early as 1928. The coat of arms was adopted at the 1932 National Convention by the National Legislative Body. The official coat of arms consists of a Grecian helmet and torse over the shield, crossed rifles and torch with the inscription "Pershing Rifles" and the founding date "1894."
 Membership Ribbon – The Membership Ribbon, adopted by Pershing Rifles in 1951, is identical to the Army Good Conduct Medal (except it is blue rather than red), which denotes exemplary conduct at all times. It is worn on the left breast of the uniform. The six white stripes on the membership ribbon, from the wearer's right to left stand for; Devotion to Duty and Country, A Bold and True Heart, Readiness to Meet any Situation, Leadership, Military Proficiency and Scholarship.
 Membership Shoulder Cord (Fourragère) – The Shoulder Cord is a symbol of honor bestowed to the Pershing Rifles member upon initiation and is to be worn on the left shoulder. First worn by Pershing Riflemen at the University of Nebraska as early as 1924, The original colors of the cord were blue and white – the colors of the Society. The Cord has been purple and white with the tip bearing the Pershing Rifles Crest since the late 1950s. There is no documented evidence as to why this change was made.
 Official Flower – The White Rose. Traditionally, this flower represents the most important man or family of the era. The white rose symbolizes the great life of the Society's patron, General of the Armies John Joseph Pershing, who made the ideals of the Pershing Rifles a reality.
 Jewel – There is no official Jewel of Pershing Rifles, however both pearls and diamonds were used in early Pershing Rifles badges.

Focus on drill
Pershing Rifles is a leadership development program with a foundation in close-order and exhibition rifle drill. Excellence in drill, whether armed or unarmed, is a function of discipline and dedication that translate into other endeavors in life. These traits are put to work on a regular basis by Pershing Rifles units which typically perform as color guards, exhibition drill teams, honor guards, funeral details, or ceremonial duties. These services are usually in support of the local ROTC detachment or school, but are sometimes requested by alumni, local governments, or active duty military units. Through all of these activities, in addition to the skills gained by the students, positive publicity is also received by the unit's host school, host ROTC detachment, and ultimately the military in general. Pershing Rifles hosts the John J. Pershing Memorial Drill Competition each spring which attracts some of the finest college and high school level drill teams in the nation.

History

Founding
In 1891, General Pershing, then a 2LT in Troop L, 6th Cavalry Regiment at Fort Bayard, New Mexico, became the Professor of Military Science and Tactics at the University of Nebraska. Pershing wished to increase the morale and discipline of the battalion there, as well as to increase support for the Cadet Corps throughout the university's staff and community. To this end, he formed a hand-picked company of men, known as Company A, and made them his premier drill unit.

The following year, Company A won the Maiden Competition at the National Competitive Drills held at Omaha, Nebraska, earning the "Omaha Cup" and $1,500 for the group. The spectators were so excited by the event that they left their seats and carried the cadets off the field. On 2 October 1894, former members of Company A formed "Varsity Rifles". A total of 39 picked cadets and alumni met in the university's armory to hold their first meeting, Lieutenant Pershing consented to act as temporary drillmaster for the organization. On 1 June 1895, the organization, in appreciation of the initiative and cooperation of LT. Pershing, changed its name to the "Pershing Rifles." Under Pershing's leadership, the organization won the Army Silver Cup for drill team competition, coming in second place after West Point. When Pershing left Nebraska in 1895, at the request of a committee, he gave to the company a pair of his cavalry breeches. These breeches were cut into small pieces and were worn on the uniform as a sign of membership.

The first decade of the 20th century saw the Pershing Rifles reach the height of its existence prior to the First World War. It was one of the most important features of University of Nebraska military and social life. Membership was considered a great military honor. Its influence in the Military Department continued strong until just before World War I.

As war clouds gathered over Europe in 1915, Pershing Rifles membership began to decline. By 1918 the Reserve Officer's Training Program (ROTC), that had just been established two years earlier in 1916 was suspended. It was temporarily replaced by the Students' Army Training Corps (SATC) which had a mission of rapidly training and commissioning new officers for service in World War I. As a result, the Pershing Rifles activities at the University of Nebraska were suspended and its records were burned.

The end of World War I saw the disbandment of SATC and the return to campus of ROTC and Pershing Rifles.

Reestablishment

In 1919 the Pershing Rifles was reborn. As organized in 1919, the Pershing Rifles became an organization for junior officers. It regained its status as a fraternal organization for ROTC basic course cadets. The presence of Scabbard and Blade on the Nebraska campus probably prevented its growth as an officers' organization.

By the 1920s, the prestige of the organization was once again on the rise, in no small part due to the popularity of General of the Armies John J. Pershing, then one of the most famous people in the World as the result of his skilled leadership of the American Expeditionary Force in World War I. Special drill units across the nation began to seek admittance into the Pershing Rifles.

The present National Society of Pershing Rifles owes its existence to The Ohio State University (OSU). In the spring of 1924 it applied for affiliation with the Pershing Rifles, but the Nebraska organization refused. The Ohio State group, seeing the need for a national organization for basic course ROTC men, threatened to nationalize "The President's Guard" and leave Nebraska out of it if the two organizations could not work together. Finally, after a year of negotiations, Nebraska's Pershing Riflemen approved Ohio State's formal application of 13 May 1925. Ohio State's company was chartered on 22 May 1925, marking the beginning of a nationwide organization.

The year 1928 brought the establishment of an official National Headquarters at the University of Nebraska which was organized along the lines of a US Army brigade headquarters. P/R Colonel John P. McKnight was the first National Commander. National Headquarters used 1928 to plan the foundation for an expansion at the company level which would ensure a strong national organization. In the summer of the same year, a number of circulars were sent to universities that did not hold a Pershing Rifles units, inviting their crack drill units to apply for charters from the national headquarters. Those who knew the value of the Pershing Rifles as an organization capable of promoting interest in drill work for basic students heeded the circulars. During that summer, officers attached to the schools where Pershing Rifles chapters were hosted met with officers from other institutions and as such, the organization received excellent publicity.

By 1929, six companies formed the original nucleus of the Pershing Rifles national organization:

National Headquarters – University of Nebraska

First Battalion
 Company A – University of Nebraska – 1894
 Company B – Ohio State University – 1925
 Company C – University of Tennessee – 1927
 Company D – University of Iowa – 1929

Second Battalion
 Company E – Northwestern University – 1929
 Company F – Indiana University – 1929

By 1935 the Pershing Rifles had grown to 22 companies. The 1930s were the first Golden Age of Pershing Rifles, which saw so much sustained growth that it had expanded its structure to emulate the organization of the World War I US Army Infantry Division.

Pershing Rifles again closed its doors in 1943, this time as a result of World War II. Active and alumni Pershing Riflemen went off to war, serving with distinction and valor. One example is Marine Corps Major Kenneth D. Bailey, an alumnus of Company F-3 at the University of Illinois. Major Bailey was killed in action on September 26, 1942, on Guadalcanal in the Solomon Islands and posthumously received the Medal of Honor for his valor that day. Another is Army Air Corps Lt Richard Joyce, an alumnus of Company A-2 at the University of Nebraska, who piloted a B-25 that bombed Japan as part of the famous Doolittle Raid on 18 April 1942.

Post World War II history

The Society was reactivated in January 1946, heralding the second Golden Age of Pershing Rifles which lasted to the early 1970s. During World War II many Pershing Riflemen were drafted directly from college and served as enlisted men to meet urgent wartime manpower requirements. After the war they returned to finish their college education using their G.I. Bill education benefits. It was this nucleus of WWII combat veterans that spearheaded the rebirth of Pershing Rifles.

The late 1940s and the 1950s were years of great expansion for the Society. By 1948, just two years after reactivation, Pershing Rifles had grown to 38 companies in seven Regiments. It was now larger than its prewar strength. By 1957, Pershing Rifles had grown to 130 units in twelve Regiments an over 300% increase in size in just 11 years.

In 1955, Pershing Rifles produced and released a documentary, "The Highest Ideals". This 27-minute Technicolor film discussed the history, traditions and missions of Pershing Rifles. Copies of the film were distributed to Pershing Rifles units throughout the country as a means of promoting the organization to prospective members.

With the establishment of a separate US Air Force on 18 September 1947, Air Force ROTC cadets joined the ranks of Pershing Rifles. The Pershing Rifles National Assembly in November 1947 agreed to accept Navy ROTC cadets making the Society a true multi-service organization.

With the President's Executive Order 9981 of 26 July 1948 that abolished racial discrimination in the US Armed Forces, Pershing Rifles rapidly integrated African American cadets and Historically Black units into the Society. As a result, today the Society counts among its alumni many African American military leaders such as General Colin Powell former Chairman of the Joint Chiefs of Staff and United States Secretary of State.

Over the next several decades, the Pershing Rifles continued to grow. In 1961, the Society had 139 active units with nearly 4,100 initiates for that year alone. Then Pershing Rifles disappeared from many college campuses during and following the Vietnam War with the dissolution of ROTC programs and the end of compulsory ROTC basic courses. In response to the shrinking number of units and Riflemen within these units, the National Headquarters increased the emphasis on tactics and marksmanship. By 1974 the Pershing Rifles was organized into thirteen regiments comprising 137 units.

The Coed Affiliates Pershing Rifles (CAPERS), established in 1966, were the first officially recognized female auxiliary to the Society which established units alongside Pershing Rifles units for decades until it was disbanded in the 1980s. The 1970s saw the introduction of women into the National Society of Pershing Rifles as full members, with the first female pledge at Company L-4 (North Carolina State University) in 1971 and the first female active member from M-16 (Florida State University) a year later.

The high school auxiliary to Pershing Rifles, The National Society of Blackjacks (a tribute to General Pershing's nickname), was founded in 1967 as an after school programs that provide positive leadership experience through drill.

The late 1970s through the 1990s was a period where the number of Pershing Rifles units continued to decline. After Desert Storm both the US Military and Pershing Rifles were hard pressed to attract members. However the Society continued on in a few Pershing Rifles units across the country.  The spirit, strength and traditions of the Society continued on in a few strong Pershing Rifles units across the country.

The 9/11 attacks created a groundswell of support for the US Military brought on by a new spirit of patriotism in the American public. This was echoed in the sense of duty and service amongst college students which has sustained the growth and popularity of Pershing Rifles from 2001 to present.

After over 125 years Pershing Rifles is going strong and continues to inspire students and create future leaders in the military, business, industry and the arts.

Membership and competitions

 Active membership is restricted to college students enrolled at an institution that hosts a Pershing Rifles company. Members may be either male or female and while a majority have affiliation with the military (especially ROTC), it is not a prerequisite for membership.

Each company has latitude in selecting their uniform and weapons. They vary from company T-shirt and BDU or ACU pants to more formal uniforms, like the Army's service uniforms, or "Class A's". Many companies wear berets, in a wide variety of colors. The only real consistencies within companies are the wear of a Pershing Rifles rank shield and, on dress uniforms, a shoulder cord and the Pershing Rifles Service Ribbon, which is blue with six vertical white lines, symbolic of the six core values held by a Pershing Rifleman.

Pershing Rifles Company W-4 at The College of William & Mary may wear uniforms based on those of the Scots Guards as recognition of their role as the Queens' Guard, the college's ceremonial guard unit, twice mustered upon visits by Queen Elizabeth II to the college.

Most Pershing Rifles companies use older battle rifles (especially the M1903 Springfield or M1 Garand) in performing routines. At the annual National Society of Pershing Rifles National Convention and Drill Competition (NATCON), active companies compete in various categories of regulation drill (like proficiency at performing a color guard) and exhibition drill (also known as trick drill, involving spinning or throwing the rifles).

Other Pershing Rifles companies, such as Company A-12 (Northeastern University), Company B-9 (University of Colorado at Boulder), Company C-9 (Colorado School of Mines), Company B-12 (Boston University) and Company C-12(ABN) (Massachusetts Institute of Technology), focus on tactical training. These companies teach their members skills such as escape and evasion, survival skills, rappelling, hand-to-hand combat, and marksmanship. Company C-4(Clemson University) practices and focuses on regulation D&C, and a mastery of exhibition drill.

Pershing Rifles Group

The Pershing Rifles Group is incorporated in the state of Delaware and is a registered 501(C)10 not-for-profit organization under the Internal Revenue Service. It is the supporting corporation to Pershing Rifles which furnishes the Society with basic services such as insurance as well as legal, regulatory, and fiscal oversight.

Pershing Rifles Foundation

The Pershing Foundation is a 501(c)(3) non-profit organization.

The foundation provides grants and financial support for such things as scholarships, providing assistance to individual Pershing Rifles and Blackjacks units, as well as supporting the Pershing Rifles Group's national efforts in expansion and operations. This includes events such as the annual Pershing Rifles National Convention and Alumni Reunion (NATCON) and various regimental drill competitions and alumni reunions.

Notable alumni

Government
 Nelson Gibbs – Company R-8 – Assistant Secretary of the Air Force
 Sid McMath – Decorated Marine, attorney, 34th Governor of Arkansas
 Charles Burton Robbins – Member of the original Company A, served in the Spanish–American War, Mexican Border service and World War I, Assistant Secretary of War 1928–29
 Colin Powell – Company A-8 – chairman, Joint Chiefs of Staff, Secretary of State
 George L. Sheldon – Commander of Company A – founding member of Varsity Rifles, 14th Governor of Nebraska
 Elvis Jacob Stahr, Jr. – Company C-1 – Secretary of the Army 1961–62, president West Virginia University & Indiana University, president National Audubon Society

Military
 Lieutenant General Christopher P. Weggeman USAF - Company E-3 - Deputy Commander of Air Combat Command.
 Major Kenneth D. Bailey Marine Corps – Company C-3 – posthumous Medal of Honor recipient during the Battle of Guadalcanal in World War II
 Brigadier General Walter J. Bickston – Company A-8 – Chief of Staff, XVIII Airborne Corps and Sixth US Army, Silver Star x 2, Soldier Medal, Bronze Star V Device
 Lieutenant General Bob Coffey – Company A-1 – Deputy Commander, U.S. Army Europe
 Major General Arthur Dean – Company J-8 – Director of Military Personnel Management, Office of the Deputy Chief of Staff
 Major Myron F. Diduryk – Company N-8 – Two Silver Stars, Company Commander in the Battle of Ia Drang, Vietnam, KIA 2nd Vietnam tour
 Major General Douglas Dollar – Company C-7 – Infantry platoon leader in Vietnam, commander 95th and 80th Divisions, founder of Oklahoma Military Hall of Fame.
 Lieutenant General Samuel Ebbesen – Company A-8 – Commander, 6th Infantry Division, 2nd Army; Civilian Aide to the Secretary of the Army
 General Larry Ellis – Company J-8 – Commander, Forces Command
 Brigadier General William J. Fiorentino – Company D-8 – Project manager/program executive for Pershing Project Office, Joint Tactical Missile System, Ballistic Missile Defense, Army Space Study, Forward Area Air Defense Systems. Ordnance Hall of Fame.
 Colonel James Gallivan – Company M-16 – Chief of Staff, 1st Cavalry Division
 Brigadier General Arnold N. Gordon-Bray – Company R-7 – Deputy Commanding General, US Army Cadet Command
 Major General Kenneth D. Gray – Company H-1 – first African American Judge Advocate General officer
 Brigadier General Edward F. Gudgel – Company C-1 – Pledged in 1942, entered West Point in 1945, Field Artillery officer who retired as a BG in 1974
 Major General Patrick Higgins – Company Q-8 – Commanding General, Joint Forces Special Operations Command – Africa; deputy director for Requirements J8, Joint Chiefs of Staff
 Major General General George A. Horkan – Company E-4 – Served as the Army's 34th Quartermaster General 1951–54
 Major General Donald L Jacka – Company G-7 – Commanding General, 3rd Corps Support Command and V Corps (Rear); deputy director, J4,  Joint Chiefs of Staff; Kansas Secretary of Agriculture
 Major General Galen Jackman – Company A-2 – Commanding General, Military District of Washington ; US Army Chief of Legislative Liaison
 First Lieutenant Richard O. Joyce – Company A-2 – Pilot in Doolittle's WWII Tokyo Raid on 18 April 1942
 General Jack Keane – Company D-8 – Vice Chief of Staff of the Army
 Brigadier General Timothy Lake – Company N-4- Virgin Islands National Guard, Deputy Commander Joint Task Force Guantanamo
 General Curtis LeMay – Company A-1 – Chief of Staff of the Air Force
 Brigadier General Thomas Maffey – Company N-8 – Vice Director J7 Joint Force Development, Joint Staff; US Army Director of Training G-3/5/7; service in Grenada, Panama, Iraq, and Afghanistan
 Brigadier General Charles McGee – Company C-3 – Fighter Pilot, Tuskegee Airmen, 409 combat missions as a fighter pilot in World War II, Korea, and Vietnam
 Lieutenant General Paul Mikolashek – Company D-1 – Army Inspector General
 Major General James H. Mukoyama – Company C-3 – Infantry company commander in Vietnam where he was wounded and received the Silver Star, 70th Division commander
 Colonel William H. Oury – Company A-2 – A-2 Commander 1897, Nebraska Football Pioneer, Commander 314th Infantry Regiment 79th Division WWI, University of Nebraska Commandant of Cadets 1930–39, Silver Star, Distinguished Service Medal
 General Colin Powell – Company A-8 – chairman, Joint Chiefs of Staff, Secretary of State
 Colonel Thomas L. Ridge, Marine Corps – Company F-3 – Commander of 3rd Bn 1st Marine Division, Korean War led his men to safety in the retreat from the Chosin Reservoir, Silver Star, 3x Purple Heart
 Lieutenant General Michael Rochelle – Company C-15 (today R-4) – Commanding General, US Army Recruiting Command; Deputy Chief of Staff G-1
 Brigadier General Guy Sands-Pingot, Company D-8 – Commanding officer, 573rd Civil Affairs Command
 General Hugh Shelton – Company L-4 – chairman, Joint Chiefs of Staff
 Lieutenant General Michael Spigelmire – Company G-15 – Commander, U.S. Army Special Operations Command
 Lieutenant General William E. Ward Company J-8 – Commander, Africa Command
 Brigadier General Ernest Talbert – Company E-8 – Vice Commander, Delaware Air National Guard
 Major General Eric Nelson – Company E-8 – Air Force program executive officer for command, control and communication (C3) programs, Hanscom Air Force Base
 Colonel Robert W. Vincent - Company C-7 - 35 combat missions in WWII as a B-24 Pilot, managed infrared satellites, U-2 support. Distinguished Flying Cross, Soldier's Medal, the Air Medal x6

Academic
 Edward M. Coffman – Company C-1 – Noted military historian
 Geary Eppley – Athletic Director, University of Maryland 1937–47, won seven national championships
 Elvis Jacob Stahr, Jr. – Company C-1 – Secretary of the Army 1961–62, president West Virginia University & Indiana University, president National Audubon Society

Arts/entertainment
 James Earl Jones – Company D-3 – Award-winning actor
 G. Gordon Liddy – Company D-8 – Army officer, lawyer, FBI agent, politician, radio personality, actor
 Robert Mapplethorpe – Company I-8 – Photographer
 Dr. Brooke Magnanti – Company M-16 – Bestselling author

Wartime losses of Pershing Riflemen
Pershing Riflemen have served in all branches of the U.S. Armed Forces in every conflict since the Spanish–American War. Several have died in the service of their country during wartime. They include:

World War II
 Marine Corps Major Kenneth D. Bailey – Company C-3 – Killed in action on September 26, 1942, on Guadalcanal in the Solomon Islands, posthumous recipient of the Medal of Honor, Silver Star
 Army Lieutenant Oscar H. Alexis – Company A-2 – Killed in action on June 25, 1944, at Montieri, Italy
 Navy Lieutenant William S. Devereaux – Company A-2 – Killed in action in March 1943, in the Russell Islands while serving as the operations officer on a PT boat
 Army First Lieutenant Archibald C. Dudley – Company C-4 – Killed in action on December 6, 1944, near Pachten, Germany while serving as an infantry platoon leader in C Company, 357th Infantry Regiment, 90th Infantry Division
 Army Air Corps First Lieutenant Robert Gehle Jobe – Company F-1 – Killed in action over Altenkirchen, Germany on February 22, 1944, while serving as a B-17 bomber navigator
 Army Air Corps Second Lieutenant Wallace Hembrough – Company F-3 – Killed in action on February 21, 1945, while flying over north-western Germany as a bombardier-navigator
 Army First Lieutenant George S. Koushnareff – Company A-8 – Died of wounds on 16 November 1942, during the invasion of North Africa
 Army Air Corps Cadet Robert A. Nelson – Company A-2 – Died April 28, 1941, in a plane crash during pilot training
 Navy Ensign Brooks L. Potter – Company A-2 – Died on May 24, 1944, near Seattle, Washington in a plane crash

Korea
 Army Second Lieutenant James J. Kiernan – Company D-8 – Killed in action in North Korea on August 18, 1952

Vietnam
 Marine Corps Second Lieutenant Jesse Rutledge Baker – Company C-4 – Killed in action on August 18, 1967, when the jeep in which he was a riding detonated a box mine in a road near Da Nang, Vietnam
 Army Major Anthony J. Broullon – Company Q-8 – Killed on September 8, 1969, in Long An, Vietnam while serving as a military adviser, he was shot by a mentally disturbed South Vietnamese soldier
 Army Major Roy E. Congleton – Charter Member of Company L-4 – Killed in action on December 21, 1964, as a result of small arms fire while serving as a Military Assistance Command Vietnam advisor.
 Army First Lieutenant Frank Cesare Deusebio – Company D-8 – Died of wounds on March 18, 1968, as a result of enemy small arms fire, Silver Star Recipient
 Army Major Myron F. Diduryk – Company N-8 – Killed in action on April 24, 1970, during his second tour in Vietnam. Two Silver Stars, Company Commander in the Battle of Ia Drang, Vietnam
 Ammy First Lieutenant Raymond Joseph Flynn, Jr., Company L-1, Wounded in the head while serving as a pilot returning from a mission in Ba Xugen Province, South Vietnam on 2 December 1970, died 15 days later on 17 December 1970.
 Army First Lieutenant Gary Dennis Fernandez – Company Q-8 – Killed in action on January 7, 1968, by a landmine in Binh Duong Provence, Vietnam
 Army Private First Class Galen Dean Grethen – Company G-2 – Killed in action on April 16, 1966, by small arms fire in Vietnam while serving as a combat medic.
 Air Force First Lieutenant John Charles Hauschildt – Company F-3 – Killed in action on October 5, 1965,  by small arms fire during his F-100 fighter direct air support mission near Tuy Hoa, Vietnam, Distinguished Flying Cross, Air Medal recipient; attended the University of Illinois before acceptance at the Air Force Academy
 Army First Lieutenant John Robert Hagood- Company A-2/National Headquarters – Killed in action on November 1, 1969, in Quang Binh, Vietnam as a result of an explosive device (Buried in Arlington National Cemetery)
 Army Captain Thomas T. Hewitt - Commander Company E-7. Co C, 2d Bn, 506th Infantry, 101st Airborne Division. Killed in Action on July 2, 1970, in Thua Thien province, Vietnam. Bronze Star, Purple Heart, Vietnam Gallantry Cross 
 Army Captain Richard J. Hock – Company F-1 - HHC, 2 Bn, 501st Infantry, 101 Airborne Division. Fatally wounded January 16, 1972 in Thua Thien, South Viet-Nam from injuries received in a non-combat related helicopter accident.
 Army First Lieutenant Richard Douglas Hogarth – Company D-1 – Killed in action on May 6, 1966, in Binh Dinh, Vietnam as a result of small arms fire.
 Army First Lieutenant Vasser W. Hurt III – Company O-4 – Died of wounds on May 2, 1970, in Quang, Vietnam as a result of an explosive device (buried at Arlington National Cemetery)
 Army Captain John J. Kalen – Company A-12 – Killed in action on September 16, 1969, when his helicopter was shot down during a low-level reconnaissance mission near Pleiku, Vietnam
 Army Second Lieutenant James P. Kelly – La Salle College – Killed in action on September 27, 1965, while serving near An Khe, Vietnam
 Army First Lieutenant Phillip Lewis Lee – A-1 – Died of wounds in a stateside hospital on June 17, 1971, as a result of wounds from small arms fire in Vietnam to month earlier.
 Army Major David R. Mackey – Company B-3 – Killed in a helicopter crash near Long An on September 17, 1969, while serving in South Vietnam, two Silver Stars, seven Bronze Stars with V Device recipient.
 Army First Lieutenant Terry Lee Manz – Company D-2 – Killed by Friendly Fire on January 28, 1967, when the helicopter he was flying was hit by South Vietnamese artillery fire, Distinguished Flying Cross and Air Medal recipient
 Army Captain Fred Howell McMurray, Jr – Company C-4 – Missing in action, presumed dead on November 13, 1974, in Au Shau Valley, Thua Thien Province, South Vietnam. His aircraft was hit by enemy ground fire, began burning in flight, and crashed. Silver Star, Distinguished Flying Cross, Air Medal, Purple Heart
 Army First Lieutenant James A. Merrett – Company D-10 – Killed in action by small arms fire on December 12, 1968, in Hau Nghia Province, Vietnam
 Army First Lieutenant Emory George Mikula – Company N-8 – Killed when his jeep drove over a Mine, October 13, 1966 ; Gallantry Cross w Palm; Bronze Star; Purple Heart; National Order Medal Fifth Class – Buried Holy Cross Cemetery,  North Arlington, NJ – First St Peter's College Graduate to die in Vietnam
 Army Captain Michael R. Odum – Company M-16 – Killed in action by small arms fire on September 11, 1969, in Phong Dinh Province, Vietnam  (Buried at Arlington National Cemetery)
 Army Captain Christopher J. O'Sullivan – Company D-8 – Killed in action in Vietnam on May 30, 1965, hit by shrapnel while helping carry wounded men to safety and directing strikes, O'Sullivan Plaza in New York City was named in his honor, Distinguished Service Cross and Silver Star recipient
 Army First Lieutenant Michael Peterson,  Troop L-1, Killed in action on 24 October 1970 in Phuoc Tuy Province (now Ba Ria-Vung Tau Province, South Vietnam.
 Army First Lieutenant Robert Thomas Rice, Jr – Battery G-1 – Killed in action by enemy mortar fire on August 8, 1970, near Pleiku, Vietnam, Silver Star recipient
 Army First Lieutenant Gregory C. Schoper – Company  C-4 – Killed in action on February 14, 1970, in Tay Ninh, Vietnam by enemy small arms fire (Buried in Arlington National Cemetery) Bronze Star w/ Oak Leaf Cluster, Air Medal, Purple Heart, Silver Star recipient
 Army Second Lieutenant Gary Arold Scott – Company F-8 – Died of wounds in Vietnam on March 29, 1968, as a result of enemy ambush in Hue, Vietnam,  Silver Star recipient
 Air Force Captain Robert Wilbur Smith – Squadron A-15 – Weapons system officer, in rear seat of F-4 that was lost to enemy ground fire on 17 April 1970 over Binh Dinh Province, Vietnam
 Army Captain Charles F. Thomas, IV – Company B-3 – Killed in action on April 8, 1971, as a result of enemy mortar fire in Binh Dinh Province, Vietnam.
 Army First Lieutenant David B Wainwright – Company F-1 – Died near Tuy Hoa Vietnam on October 4, 1967, when the MEDIVAC helicopter he was flying crashed, Distinguished Flying Cross and Air Medal recipient
 Army First Lieutenant Sterling A. Wall – Company A-12 – Killed in a helicopter crash on August 24, 1967, while returning to his forward operating base in Pleiku Province, Vietnam

Iraq
 Army Second Lieutenant Jeffrey C. Graham – Company C-1 – Killed in action in Iraq on February 19, 2004, when a bomb exploded as he was warning others in his platoon
 Army Captain Matthew C. Mattingly – Battery G-1 – Killed in action on September 13, 2006, in Mosul, Iraq, when he encountered enemy forces using small-arms fire during combat operations.
 Army Captain Jonathan D. Grassbaugh – Company E-8 (Now T-8) – Killed in action on April 7, 2007, in Zaganiyah, Iraq, when an improvised explosive device detonated as he conducted a combat logistics patrol.
 Army First Lieutenant Ryan Patrick Jones – Company E-12 – Died of wounds on May 2, 2007, in Baghdad, Iraq of injuries suffered when his vehicle struck a roadside bomb.
 Army First Lieutenant Michael L. Runyan – Battery G-1 – Killed in action in Balad, Iraq on July 21, 2010, as a result improvised explosive device in Muqdaiyah, Iraq
 Army Captain Kafele H. Sims – Company G-8 – Died June 16, 2009, in Mosul, Iraq, of a non-combat-related injury.

Afghanistan
 Army Sergeant Gregory Owens Jr. – Company Q-17 – Died of wounds on July 20, 2009, in Maydan Shahr, Afghanistan, when an improvised explosive device detonated near his vehicle followed by an attack from enemy forces using small arms and rocket-propelled grenades
 Army Second Lieutenant Justin Sisson – Company M-16 – Killed in action in Tsamkani, Afghanistan on June 3, 2013, by a suicide bomber

Quotes

 "We, the members of Pershing Rifles, National Honorary Military Society, in order to encourage, preserve and develop the highest ideals of the military profession, to promote American citizenship, to create a closer and more efficient relation, and to provide appropriate recognition of a high degree of military ability among the cadets of the several senior Reserve Officers' Training Corps units of the Government of our organization, do hereby establish this constitution." – preamble to the 1939 Pershing Rifles constitution
 "To foster a spirit of friendship and cooperation among men in the military department and to maintain a highly efficient drill company." – Pershing Rifles 1951 Pledge Manual
 "For the first time in my life I was a member of a brotherhood," [Colin] Powell would later say about the Pershing Rifles. "The discipline, the structure, the camaraderie, the sense of belonging were what I craved. … I found a selflessness within our ranks that reminded me of the caring atmosphere within my family. Race, color, background, income meant nothing."
 "It was The Pershing Rifles and Army ROTC at Fordham that got me interested in the Army as a possible career and I have maintained an association with many of them all these years." – General John M. "Jack" Keane, Former Vice Chief of Staff of the Army
 "As part of the ROTC program, I joined the Pershing Rifles because they seemed more confident and accomplished than the other participants in ROTC."  – General John M. "Jack" Keane, Former Vice Chief of Staff of the Army
 "Of all the honors and societies, the one I enjoyed the most was the Pershing Rifles. I think we had about 36 members, and we got to march in all the major parades, all across the state. I enjoyed the perfection and the esprit de' corps." - John Lemons, P/R Company E-4, Virginia Tech, graduated 1960
 "I waited until my junior year to pledge … The Pershing Rifles. This was later than most other students, but all my life I was a late bloomer. The pledging was tough and physical, but also military. I received a lot more exposure to weapons and military discipline than I would otherwise have obtained. My brother was in Vietnam and I believed I would wind up there, too." - Stephen J. Candela
 "We are amongst the most prestigious military organizations that you can join. We do many of the color guards for UK sporting events and around the local tri state area. … The most rewarding part (of Pershing Rifles) is definitely the camaraderie that we have within our organization. We are a family honestly. I would be happy to serve next to or do anything for my brothers and sisters in this organization." – Sarah M. Schmitz, XO, Pershing Rifles Company C-1, University of Kentucky 2014

National commanders

+ Craig Zagorski was promoted to Major General and National Commander for one day immediately following the end of Christopher D. Scheuermann's term in 2008.

Note: By tradition a National Commander is promoted to Lieutenant General/Vice Admiral if they serve a second term in office. Since the mid-2000s some Pershing Rifles National Commanders have been promoted to the rank of Pershing Rifles Lieutenant General/Vice Admiral upon completion of a full term in office.

Units
Known Pershing Rifles units past and present (Note that some company numbers were used by more than one university or college over time) + denotes active units. By tradition the National Headquarters is at the University of Nebraska at Lincoln. However the current National Staff is selected from across the Society and staff members may be from a number of different Pershing Rifles units. The Regimental/Brigade Headquarters locations listed are the historical locations of these units. Currently Pershing Rifles has a combined Regimental structure where two or more Regiments are grouped under one Regimental Commander who may be selected from any unit in the combined Regiment.
 National Headquarters (Originally at the University of Nebraska Lincoln)
 CAPER – Coed Affiliates Pershing Rifles (The former female auxiliary to Pershing Rifles)
 National Society of Blackjacks (The High School leadership program of Pershing Rifles)

1st Regiment
 Headquarters – University of Toledo, Toledo, Ohio / The Ohio State University, Columbus, Ohio
 1st Battalion – Kent State University, Kent, Ohio (1970s), originally organized at the University of Akron, Akron, Ohio in 1961
 2nd Battalion – University of Kentucky, Lexington, Kentucky (1970s)
 3rd Battalion – West Virginia University, Morgantown, West Virginia (1970s)
 +Company A-1 – The Ohio State University, Columbus, Ohio (Founded: 1925)
 +Company B-1 – The University of Dayton, Dayton, Ohio
 +Company C-1 – The University of Kentucky, Lexington, Kentucky
 Company D-1 – The University of Akron, Akron, Ohio
 +Company E-1 – The University of Cincinnati, Cincinnati, Ohio
 Company F-1 – Ohio University,  Athens, Ohio
 +Battery G-1 – Xavier University, Cincinnati, Ohio
 Company H-1 – West Virginia State College/University, Institute, West Virginia
 Company H-1 – University of Michigan, Ann Arbor, Michigan (1948)
 +Company I-1 – Bowling Green State University, Bowling Green, Ohio
 +Company J-1 – Wright State University, Dayton, Ohio (Founded: 2011)
 Company K-1 – Kent State University, Kent, Ohio
 +Troop L-1 – University of Toledo, Toledo, Ohio (Founded: February 5, 1951)
 +Company M-1 – John Carroll University, Cleveland, Ohio
 Company N-1 – Marshall University, Huntington, West Virginia
 +Company O-1 – Cedarville University, Cedarville, Ohio (Founded: March 14, 2015)
 Company P-1 – Youngstown State University, Youngstown, Ohio
 Company Q-1 – Miami University, Oxford, Ohio (Founded March 16, 2018)
 +Company R-1 – Eastern Kentucky University, Richmond, Kentucky
 Company S-1 – West Virginia University, Morgantown, West Virginia
 +Company T-1 – Central State University/College, Wilberforce, Ohio (Founded: May 1957, Rechartered 2010)
 Company V-1 – Morehead State University, Morehead, Kentucky
 Company W-1 – Indiana University of Pennsylvania, Indiana, Pennsylvania
 Company X-1 – Xavier University, Cincinnati, Ohio
 Company Y-1 – PennWest Clarion, Clarion, Pennsylvania
 Company Z-1 – Capital University, Columbus, Ohio

2nd Regiment
 Headquarters – Marquette University, Milwaukee, Wisconsin / University of Minnesota, Minneapolis, Minnesota / University of Iowa, Iowa City, Iowa
 +Company A-2 – University of Nebraska–Lincoln (Pershing's Own), Lincoln, Nebraska
 Company B-2 – State University of Iowa / Iowa State University, Iowa City, Iowa
 Company B-2 – Washington University in St. Louis, Missouri (Has also been N-3, B-7)
 Company C-2 – University of Wisconsin-Madison, Madison, Wisconsin
 Company D-2 – University of Wisconsin, Milwaukee, Wisconsin
 Company D-2 – University of South Dakota, Vermillion, South Dakota (1948)
 Company E-2 – University of Minnesota, Minneapolis, Minnesota
 +Company E-2 – South Dakota School of Mines, Rapid City, South Dakota
 Company F-2 – University of South Dakota, Vermillion, South Dakota (Company D-2 in the 1930s & 40s)
 Company F-2 – North Dakota State University, Fargo, North Dakota (1948)
 Company G-2 – Iowa State University, Ames, Iowa (Founded: 1929)
 Company H-2 – Saint John's University, Collegeville, Minnesota
 Company I-2 – Marquette University, Milwaukee, Wisconsin
 +Company K-2 – Lincoln University, Jefferson City, Missouri
 Company K-2 – South Dakota State College/University, Brookings, South Dakota
 Company L-2 – Ripon College, Ripon, Wisconsin
 +Company L-2 – Missouri State University, Springfield, Missouri (Was L-7)
 Company M-2 – University of Wisconsin-Oshkosh, Oshkosh, Wisconsin
 Company M-2 – Kemper Military School, Booneville, Missouri
 Company N-2 – University of Wisconsin – Stevens Point, Stevens Point, Wisconsin
 Company N-2 - Minnesota State University, Mankato, Mankato, Minnesota (1980s)
 Company O-2 – Northern Illinois University, DeKalb, Illinois
 Company P-2 – Creighton University, Omaha, Nebraska
 Company W-2 – University of Missouri, Columbia, Missouri (Company A-7 in 1948)

3rd Regiment/Brigade
 Headquarters – Indiana University, Bloomington, Indiana
 +Company A-3 – Indiana University, Bloomington, Indiana (Founded: 1929)
 +Company B-3 – Western Kentucky University (Western Kentucky State / Kentucky Teachers College), Bowling Green, Kentucky (Founded: 4 February 1937, Rechartered 12 March 2016)
 Company C-3 – University of Illinois-Urbana Champaign, Champaign, Illinois
 Company D-3 – University of Michigan, Ann Arbor, Michigan
 Company E-3 – Purdue University, Lafayette, Indiana
 Company F-3 – University of Illinois, Chicago, Illinois
 Company F-3 – West Virginia State College, West Virginia (1948)
 Company G-3 – Murray State Teachers College, Murray, Kentucky
 Company H-3 – Western Michigan College of Education, Kalamazoo, Michigan
 Company I-3 – DePaul University, Chicago, Illinois
 Company K-3 – Wheaton College, Wheaton, Illinois
 Company L-3 – Michigan State University, Lansing, Michigan
 Squadron M-3 – Southern Illinois University, Carbondale, Illinois
 Company N-3 – Washington University in St. Louis, Missouri (Currently B-2, was B-7)

4th Regiment
 Headquarters – Clemson University, Clemson, South Carolina
 1st Battalion – Vanderbilt University, Nashville, Tennessee
 +Company A-4 – Saint Augustine's University, North Carolina
 Company A-4 – Presbyterian College, Clinton, South Carolina
 Company A-4 – University of Tennessee, Knoxville, Tennessee (1930s & 40s, 1948) (Founded: 1927)
 Company B-4 – Tennessee Polytechnic Institute, Crossville, Tennessee
 Company B-4 – University of Alabama, university, Alabama (1930s & 40s, 1948)
 +Company C-4 – Clemson University/Agricultural College, Clemson, South Carolina
 Company D-4 – Wake Forest University, Winston-Salem, North Carolina
 Company D-4 – Louisiana State University, Baton Rouge, Louisiana (1930s & 40s, 50s)
 Company E-4 – Mercer College/University, Macon, Georgia
 Company E-4 – Campbell College, Buies Creek, North Carolina
 Company E-4 – Virginia Polytechnic Institute, Blacksburg, Virginia (1949)
 Company F-4 – Georgia School/Institute of Technology, Atlanta, Georgia
 Company G-4 – Auburn University, Auburn, Alabama
 Company G-4 – University of Florida, Gainesville, Florida (1948)
 +Company H-4 – Alabama A&M University, Huntsville, Alabama (Assigned to 6th Regiment)
 Company H-4 – Wofford College, Spartanburg, South Carolina (1961)
 Company I-4 – Jacksonville State University, Jacksonville, Alabama
 Company J-4 – University of North Alabama, Florence, Alabama (Formerly Florence State University)
 Company K-4 – South Carolina State University, Orangeburg, South Carolina (Founded:December 14, 1966)
 Company K-4 – University of South Carolina, Columbia, South Carolina
 Company L-4 – North Carolina State University, Raleigh, North Carolina
 Company M-4 – University of Chattanooga, Chattanooga, Tennessee
 +Company M-4 – Appalachian State University, Boone, North Carolina
 +Company N-4 – North Carolina A&T University, Greensboro, North Carolina
 +Company O-4 – Virginia State University, Petersburg, Virginia
 Company P-4 – Tuskegee Institute, Tuskegee, Alabama (Now P-6)
 Company Q-4 – University of Georgia, Athens, Georgia
 +Company R-4 – Norfolk State University, Norfolk, Virginia (Was C-15)
 Company R-4 – East Tennessee State College, Johnson City, Tennessee (1958)
 Company S-4 – Furman University, Greenville, South Carolina
 Company T-4 – Georgia State University, Atlanta, Georgia
 +Company U-4 – Hampton University, Hampton, Virginia (Was D-15)(Founded: 28 November 1950, Rechartered 2000)
 Company V-4 – Vanderbilt University, Nashville, Tennessee
 Company W-4 – Vanderbilt University, Nashville, Tennessee (1958, 62)
 +Company W-4 – College of William and Mary, Williamsburg, Virginia
 Company X-4 – Middle Tennessee State University, Murfreesboro, Tennessee
 Company Y-4 – Christopher Newport University, Newport News, Virginia
 +Company Z-4 – University of North Carolina at Charlotte, Charlotte, North Carolina

5th Regiment
 Headquarters – Pennsylvania State University / University Park, Pennsylvania
 1st Battalion – University of Pittsburgh, Pittsburgh, Pennsylvania (1958–59)
 2nd Battalion – Pennsylvania Military College, Chester, Pennsylvania (1958–59)
 3rd Battalion – Virginia State University, Petersburg, Virginia (1958)/Morgan State College, Baltimore, Maryland (1959)
 Company A-5 – Pennsylvania State College / University, Altoona, Pennsylvania
 Company A-5 – Carnegie Institute of Technology, Pittsburgh, Pennsylvania
 Company A-5 – University of Syracuse, Syracuse, New York (1930s & 40s,  1948)
 Company B-5 – Pennsylvania State University, University Park, Pennsylvania
 Company C-5 – University of Maryland, College Park, Maryland (1930s & 40s, 1948)
 Company D-5 – College of the City of New York, New York (1930s & 40s, 1948)
 Company D-5 – Virginia State University, Petersburg, Virginia (1958)(Now O-4)
 Company E-5 – Cornell University, Ithaca, New York (1930s & 40s, 1948)
 Company E-5 – Virginia Polytechnical Institute, Blackburg, Virginia (1958)
 Company F-5 – Lehigh University, Bethlehem, Pennsylvania
 Company G-5 – University of Pennsylvania, Philadelphia, Pennsylvania (1948)
 Company H-5 – Washington and Jefferson College, Washington, Pennsylvania
 Company H-5 – Massachusetts Institute of Technology, Cambridge, Massachusetts (1948)
 Company I-5 – Indiana University of Pennsylvania, Indiana, Pennsylvania
 Company I-5 – Hampton Institute, Hampton, Virginia (1958)
 Company K-5 – University of Pittsburgh, Pittsburgh, Pennsylvania
 Company K-5 – Fordham University, New York City, New York (20 April 1948)
 Company ?-5 – New York University, New York City, New York (1948)
 Company L-5 – Duquesne University, Pittsburgh, Pennsylvania
 Company M-5 – Bucknell University, Lewisburg, Pennsylvania
 Company N-5 – Gettysburg College, Gettysburg, Pennsylvania
 Company O-5 – Gannon College, Erie, Pennsylvania
 Company P-5 – Johns Hopkins University, Baltimore, Maryland (1952-late 1950s)
 Company Q-5 – Pennsylvania Military College, Chester, Pennsylvania
 Company R-5 – Scranton University, Scranton, Pennsylvania
 Company S-5 – Chapin Hall, George Washington University, Washington, D.C. (1958)
 Company T-5 – Loyola University, Baltimore, Maryland (1958)
 Company V-5 – Morgan State College, Baltimore, Maryland (1954)
 Company W-5 – Villanova University NROTC, Villanova, Pennsylvania (1958)
 Company X-5 – Lafayette College, Easton, Pennsylvania
 Company Y-5 – Dickinson College, Carlisle, Pennsylvania
 Headquarters Platoon Ogontz – Pennsylvania State University, Abington, Pennsylvania

6th Regiment/Brigade
 Headquarters – Louisiana State University, Baton Rouge, Louisiana / University of Idaho, Moscow, Idaho
 Company A-6 – Southern University and A&M College, Baton Rouge, Louisiana
 Company A-6 – University of California, Los Angeles, Los Angeles, California (1948)
 Company A-6 – San Diego State University, San Diego, California (1991)
 +Battery B-6 – East Tennessee State University, Johnson City, Tennessee
 Company B-6 – University of Puerto Rico, Rio Piedras, Puerto Rico (Chartered 1959)
 Company B-6 – University of California, Berkeley, California (1948)
 Company C-6 – Florida A&M College/University, Tallahassee, Florida
 Company C-6 – University of Idaho, Moscow, Idaho (1930s & 40s, 1948)
 Company D-6 – Louisiana State University, Baton Rouge, Louisiana (Now D-17)
 Company D-6 – Utah State Agricultural College, Logan, Utah (1948)
 Company F-6 – University of Southern Mississippi, Hattiesburg, Mississippi
 Company F-6 – University of Arizona (1952)
 Company G-6 – Mississippi State College, State College Mississippi (1958)
 Company I-6 – Loyola University, New Orleans, Louisiana
 Company K-6 – Tulane University, New Orleans, Louisiana
 Company M-6 – Florida State University, Tallahassee, Florida
 Company O-6 – Centenary College, Shreveport, Louisiana (1958)
 Company P-6 – Tuskegee University, Tuskegee, Alabama (Was P-4)
 Company P-6 – College of Agriculture and Mechanical Arts, Mayaguez, Puerto Rico
 Company S-6 – Stetson University, DeLand, Florida
 Company U-6 – University of Miami, Coral Gables, Florida (1958)
 Company V-6 – McNeese State College, Lake Charles, Louisiana
 Company V-6 – Spring Hill College, Spring Hill Station, Alabama (1958–59)
 Company W-6 – Spring Hill College, Mobile, Alabama
 Company Y-6 – Northeast Louisiana State College, Lake Charles, Louisiana (1958)

7th Regiment/Brigade
 Headquarters – Oklahoma State University
 Company A-7 – Pittsburg State University, Pittsburg, Kansas (Formerly Kansas State College)
 Company A-7 – University of Missouri, Columbia, Missouri (1948)
 Company A-7 – Kansas State Teacher's College, Pittsburg, Kansas (1958,59)
 Company B-7 – Washington University in St. Louis, Missouri (Has also been B-2, N-3)
 Company B-7 – Arkansas Poly Tech College, Russellville, Arkansas
 +Company C-7 – Oklahoma State University, Stillwater, Oklahoma  (Formerly Oklahoma Agricultural and Mechanical College (Oklahoma A&M))
 Company D-7 – University of Arkansas, Fayetteville, Arkansas
 Company D-7 – Louisiana State University, university, Louisiana (1958)
 Company E-7 – University of Kansas, Lawrence, Kansas
 Company F-7 – Wichita State University, Wichita, Kansas
 +Company G-7 – Kansas State College/University, Manhattan, Kansas
 Company H-7 – University of Oklahoma, Norman, Oklahoma
 Company I-7 – Arkansas State College, Little Rock, Arkansas
 Company K-7 – Missouri University of Science & Technology, Rolla, Missouri (Formerly University of Missouri at Rolla/Missouri School of Mines)
 Company L-7 – Southwest Missouri State University, Springfield, Missouri (Currently L-2)
 Company L-7 – Hardin-Simmons University, Abilene, Texas
 Company M-7 – Missouri Southern State College/Missouri Southern State University, Joplin, Missouri (unit disbanded)
 Company M-7 – Southern Methodist College/University, Dallas, Texas (1952)
 Company N-7 – Ouachita Baptist College, Arkadelphia, Arkansas
 Company O-7 – Texas College of Mines & Metallurgy, El Paso, Texas (became H-10)
 Company P-7 – University of Texas, Austin, Texas
 Company P-7 - University of Arkansas, Pine Bluff, Arkansas (2000)
 Company Q-7 – Prairie View A&M College, Prairie View, Texas
 Company R-7 – University of Central Missouri, Warrensburg, Missouri (Formerly Central Missouri State)
 Company R-7 – Trinity University, San Antonio, Texas (1958,59)
 Company S-7 – Henderson State Teacher's College, Arkadelphia, Arkansas
 Company T-7 – Southern State College, Magnolia, Arkansas
 Company T-7 – Midwestern University, Wichita Falls, Texas
 Company T-7 - University of Missouri, Columbia, Missouri (1990)
 Company V-7 – Southwestern State College, Weatherford, Oklahoma
 Company W-7 – Panhandle State College, Goodwell, Oklahoma
 Company X-7 – University of Central Oklahoma, Edmond, Oklahoma
 Company Y-7 – East Central State College, Ada, Oklahoma

8th Regiment
 Headquarters – City College of New York / Seton Hall University / Saint Peters College
 1st Battalion – Fordham, university, New York, New York
 2nd Battalion – Seton Hall, university, South Orange, New Jersey
 +Company A-8 – City College of New York, New York, New York  (Founded: 1936, Rechartered 12 March 2016)
 Company B-8 - The Pennsylvania State University, University Park, Pennsylvania (Previously B-5 and 5th Regiment HQ, became B-8 in 1970s)
 Company B-8 – Cornell University, Ithaca, New York
 +Company C-8 - University of Maryland (Chartered 11 March 2017, Was C-5, A-15)
 Company C-8 – St. Bonaventure University, Bonaventure, New York
 Company C-8 – Massachusetts Institute of Technology (1952)
 +Company D-8 -Fordham University, New York, New York (20 April 1948)
 Company E-8 – New York University, Bronx, New York
 Company E-8 – Johns Hopkins University, Baltimore, Maryland (1974–1981, 1984–2006, 2012, Was E-15, Now T-8)
 +Company F-8 – Syracuse University, Syracuse, New York
 +Company G-8 – Howard University, Washington, D.C. (Founded: 8 March 1974)
 Company G-8 – Siena College, Londonville, New York
 Company G-8 – Brooklyn College, New York City, New York
 Company G-8 – Clarkson University, Potsdam, New York (1952)
 Company H-8 – Polytechnic Institute of Brooklyn, Brooklyn, New York
 Company I-8 – Pratt Institute, Brooklyn, New York
 Company I-8 – University of Pittsburgh, Pittsburgh, Pennsylvania
 Company I-8 – Boston, university, Boston, Massachusetts (1952)
 +Company J-8 – Morgan State University, Baltimore, Maryland (Was H-15) (Founded: 15 March 1954)
 +Company K-8 – Seton Hall University, South Orange, New Jersey (Founded: 17 March 1951, Rechartered 12 March 2016)
 Company L-8 – New York University, New York, New York
 Company L-8 – Indiana University of Pennsylvania, Indiana, Pennsylvania
 Company M-8 – Columbia University, New York, New York
 Company N-8 – Saint Peters College, Jersey City, New Jersey
 +Company O-8 – Canisius College, Buffalo, New York
 Company O-8 – Gannon College, Erie, Pennsylvania
 Company P-8 – State University of New York (SUNY) Maritime, Bronx, New York
 +Company Q-8 – Hofstra University, Hempstead, New York
 Company R-8 – Clarkson College, Potsdam, New York (Founded: 1936)
 Company R-8 – Saint Johns University, Jamaica, New York
 Company S-8 – Niagara University, Niagara, New York (Funded: 7 November 1959)
 +Company T-8 – Johns Hopkins University, Baltimore, Maryland
 Company T-8 – University of Puerto Rico, Rio Piedras, Puerto Rico
 +Company X-8 – University of Delaware, Newark, Delaware (Has also been X-15)
 Company Z-8 – Rochester Institute of Technology. Rochester, NY

9th Regiment
 Headquarters – University of Colorado at Boulder/University of Denver (1958)
 Company A-9 – University of Alaska, college, Alaska
 Company A-9 – University of Denver, Denver, Colorado (1958)
 +Company B-9 – University of Colorado at Boulder, Boulder, Colorado
 Company C-9 – Colorado School of Mines, Golden, Colorado
 Company D-9 – Colorado College, Colorado Springs, Colorado
 Company D-9 – Southern Colorado State College, Pueblo, Co
 Company E-9 – South Dakota School of Mines and Technology, Rapid City, South Dakota
 Company E-9 – New Mexico College of A&M, State College, New Mexico (1958)
 Company F-9 – Idaho State College, Pocatello, Idaho (1958)
 Company G-9 – Utah State University, Logan, Utah
 Company H-9 – Colorado State University, Fort Collins, Colorado
 Company H-9 – Texas Western College, El Paso, Texas

10th Regiment
 Headquarters – Northern Arizona University, Flagstaff, Arizona/University of Arizona (1958–59)
 Company A-10 – University of Arizona, Tucson, Arizona
 +Company B-10 – California State University, Fresno, Fresno, California
 Company B-10 – University of San Francisco, San Francisco, California (1958,59)
 Company C-10 – New Mexico State University, Las Cruces, New Mexico
 Company D-10 – Arizona State College/University, Tempe, Arizona
 Company E-10 – University of Santa Clara, Santa Clara, California
 Company F-10 – San Jose State College, San Jose, California
 +Company G-10 – California Baptist University, Riverside, California
 Company G-10 – University of California at Los Angeles, Los Angeles, California
 Company H-10 – Texas Western College, El Paso, Texas (became UTEP, later H-17, now A-14)
 Company I-10 – University of California, Santa Barbara, Santa Barbara, California

11th Regiment
 Headquarters – Oregon State University, Corvallis, Oregon (Ended after 1964)
 Company A-11 – University of Alaska, college, Alaska
 Company B-11 – University of Washington, Seattle, Washington
 Company C-11 – University of Idaho, Moscow, Idaho
 Company D-11 – State College of Washington, Pullman, Washington (1958–59)
 Company E-11 – Oregon State University, Eugene, Oregon
 Company F-11 – Montana State University, Missoula, Montana (1958–59)
 Company G-11 – University of Oregon, Eugene, Oregon
 Company H-11 – Seattle University, Seattle, Washington

12th Regiment
Headquarters – Massachusetts Institute of Technology, Cambridge, Massachusetts, through June 1962, Northeastern University, Boston, Massachusetts, June 1962 through (approx) 1978 / University of Connecticut, Storrs, Connecticut
 Headquarters 1st Battalion, 12th Regiment – Boston University, Boston, Massachusetts
 Headquarters 2nd Battalion, 12th Regiment – Providence College, Providence, Rhode Island
 +Company A-12 – Northeastern University, Boston, Massachusetts
 Company B-12 – Boston University, Boston, Massachusetts
 +Company C-12 (Airborne)- Massachusetts Institute of Technology, Cambridge, Massachusetts
 Company D-12 – University of Rhode Island, Kingston, Rhode Island
 Company E-12 – Worcester Polytechnic Institute, Worcester, Massachusetts
 Company F-12 – University of Connecticut, Storrs, Connecticut
 Company F-12 – Stonehill College, Easton, Massachusetts
 Company G-12 – University of Massachusetts, Amherst, Massachusetts
 Company H-12 – University of New Hampshire, Durham, New Hampshire
 Company K-12 – Providence College, Providence, Rhode Island
 Company I-12 – Bowdoin College, Brunswick, Maine
 Company L-12 – University of Vermont, Burlington, Vermont
 Company M-12 – University of Maine, Orono, Maine
 Squadron N-12 – Lowell Technological Institute, Lowell, Massachusetts

14th Brigade/Regiment
Headquarters – Northern Arizona University, Flagstaff, Arizona
 Company A-14 – University of Texas at El Paso, El Paso, Texas (has been E-7, H-10 & H-17)
 Company W-14 – University of New Mexico, Albuquerque, New Mexico
 Company Z-14 – Northern Arizona University, Flagstaff, Arizona

15th Regiment
 Headquarters – University of Maryland, College Park, Maryland
 Company/Squadron A-15 – University of Maryland, College Park, Maryland
 Company B-15 – Virginia State College, Petersburg, Virginia (now Puerto Rico Co O-4)
 Company C-15 – Norfolk State University, Norfolk, Virginia (now R-4)
 Company C-15 – Virginia Polytechnical Institute, Blacksburg, Virginia (1961)
 Company D-15 – Hampton University, Hampton, Virginia (now U-4)
 Company E-15 – Johns Hopkins University, Baltimore, Maryland (late 1960s-1974, later E-8)
 Company/Squadron F-15 – George Washington University, Washington, D.C.
 Company G-15 – Loyola College, Baltimore, Maryland
 Company H-15 – Morgan State University, Baltimore, Maryland (now J-8)
 Company Q-15 – Pennsylvania Military College, Chester, Pennsylvania (was Q-5)
 Company P-15 – Johns Hopkins University, Baltimore, Maryland (1960s, later E-15)
 Company R-15 – University of Richmond, Richmond, Virginia
 Company X-15 – University of Delaware, Newark, Delaware (Founded: May 1969)

16th Regiment/Brigade
 Headquarters – University of Tampa, Tampa, Florida/ Florida State University, Tallahassee, Florida
 +Company A-16 – Fort Valley State University, Fort Valley, Georgia
 +Company B-16 – Morehouse College. Atlanta. Georgia
 +Company B-16 – Georgia State University. Atlanta. Georgia
 Company B-16 – University of Puerto Rico, Rio Piedras, Puerto Rico (was B-6)
 Company B-16 – Alcorn State University, Lorman, Mississippi
 +Company C-16 – Florida A&M University, Tallahassee, Florida (was C-6)
 +Company E-16 – Bethune-Cookman University, Daytona Beach, Florida
 Company E-16 – Embry Riddle Aeronautical University, Daytona Beach, Florida
 Company F-16 – University of Southern Mississippi, Hattiesburg, Mississippi
 +Company G-16 - Albany State University, Albany, Georgia (Chartered 12 March 2016)
 Company I-16 – Loyola University, New Orleans, Louisiana
 Company J-16 – Jackson State University, Jackson, Mississippi
 Company M-16 – Florida State University, Tallahassee, Florida
 Company N-16 – Nicholls State University, Thibodaux, Louisiana
 Company P-16 – College of Agriculture and Mechanical Arts, Mayaguez, Puerto Rico (was P-6)
 Company S-16 – Stetson University, DeLand, Florida
 Company T-16 – University of Tampa, Tampa, Florida
 Company U-16 – University of Miami, Coral Gables, Florida (was U-6)
 Company V-16 – University of Miami, Coral Gables, Florida
 Company W-16 – McNeese State University, Lake Charles, Louisiana
 +Company Z-16 - Florida International University, Miami, Florida (Chartered 12 March 2016)

17th Regiment
 Headquarters – Prairie View A&M University/Trinity University, San Antonio, Texas
 Company A-17 – Texas State University, San Marcos, Texas
 +Company B-17 – Alcorn State University, Lorman, Mississippi
 Company C-17 – New Mexico State University, Las Cruces, New Mexico
 +Company D-17 – Louisiana State University, Baton Rouge, Louisiana (was D-6)
 Company D-17 – Arizona State University, Tempe, Arizona
 +Company G-17 – Grambling State University, Grambling, Louisiana
 Company H-17 – University of Texas at El Paso, El Paso, Texas (Now A-14)
 Company L-17 - Hardin-Simmons University, Abilene, Texas
 Company M-17 – Stephen F. Austin State University, Nacogdoches, Texas
 Company M-17 – Eastern New Mexico University, Portales, New Mexico
 Company Q-17 – Prairie View A & M University, Prairie View, Texas
 Company R-17 – Trinity University, San Antonio, Texas
 Company T-17 – Midwestern University, Wichita Falls, Texas
 Company T-17 – Texas Tech University, Lubbock, Texas

Photo gallery

Notes

External links
 Pershing Rifles National Headquarters Facebook Page
 Pershing Rifles National Headquarters Website
 History of the Pershing Rifles
 Pershing Rifles History on Facebook
 Biography of General John J. Pershing

 
Military education and training in the United States
1894 establishments in Nebraska
Honor societies
Student organizations established in 1894
Former members of Professional Fraternity Association
Professional military fraternities and sororities in the United States